Como is a census-designated place in Whiteside County, Illinois, United States.  Its population was 567 as of the 2010 census.

Demographics

References

Census-designated places in Whiteside County, Illinois
Census-designated places in Illinois